The Gipsy-1 is a system of 2680 m long interconnected adits in Kamsko-Ustyinsky District, Tatarstan, Russia, where gypsum was mined in 1930-1950s. It is the only mine in the area that can be visited by outdoor tourists, since other similar mines have been buried or flooded.

References

History of Tatarstan
Mining in Russia